Events in the year 1955 in Spain.

Incumbents
Caudillo: Francisco Franco

Births
8 March - Francisco José Millán Mon, politician
27 March - Mariano Rajoy, former Prime Minister of Spain
5 April - Antolín Sánchez, politician
20 May - Manolo Cadenas, handball coach
8 June - José Antonio Camacho, footballer
23 September - David Hammerstein Mintz, US-born politician
1 December - Verónica Forqué, actress (died 2021)

Deaths
date unknown - Enrique Gómez, screenwriter and film director (born 1916)

See also
 List of Spanish films of 1955

References

 
Years of the 20th century in Spain
1950s in Spain
Spain
Spain